The Super Sweet 100 tomato cultivar is a hybrid that produces long fruit-bearing stems holding 100 or more very sweet cherry tomatoes. Fruits weigh approximately 1 oz., and are 1 inch across. Plants need caging or staking, and produce fruit throughout the growing season.

See also
 List of tomato cultivars
 Cherry tomato

References

Hybrid tomato cultivars